Jenny Randles is a British author and former director of investigations with the British UFO Research Association (BUFORA), serving in that role from 1982 through to 1994.

Career
Randles specializes in writing books on UFOs and paranormal phenomena. To date 50 of these have been published, ranging from her first UFOs: A British Viewpoint (1979) to Breaking the Time Barrier: The race to build the first time machine (2005). Subjects covered include crop circles, ESP, life after death, time anomalies and spontaneous human combustion.

She has also written skeptical investigations solving cases - including, co-authored with Dr David Clarke and Andy Roberts, The UFOs That Never Were (London House, 2000).

Randles has written articles for many publications including New Scientist, and has sold more than 1.5 million copies of her published books.

It was stated in 1997 that her books had been published in 24 countries.

Between 1993 and 1997 she was the story consultant to all series and a live episode of the ITV dramatized documentary series Strange but True? which featured many major cases from around the world. Its special on the Rendlesham Forest case, which Jenny was one of the first to investigate shortly after it happened, obtained over 12 million viewers, and became the most watched programme on the subject on UK TV.

Jenny also wrote two books, Strange But True? and Strange But True? Casebook tied to the TV series (Piatkus, 1994 and 1995)

She has also written and presented documentary work for BBC TV and radio.

Randles is a columnist for the magazines Fortean Times and has spoken at the UnConvention.

She coined the term, 'Oz Factor', describing the odd state of consciousness involving changes to the perception of time and space, during which strange phenomena and close encounters can occur.

She was for many years the editor of Northern UFO News (a 12-20 page A5 journal detailing UFO activity within Northern England) from 1974 up to 2001. Northern UFO News is now published freely online monthly still edited by Randles.

Bibliography
Books by Randles include:

See also
Time travel
UFOs in fiction

References

General references

Fortean Times on Jenny Randles.

External links 
Biography on ufoevidence.org
Official Northern UFO News Website
 
 

Ufologists
Fortean writers
Paranormal investigators
Living people
Year of birth missing (living people)